Three Days Grace is a Canadian rock band formed in Norwood, Ontario in 1992 originally as "Groundswell" and played in various local Norwood backyard parties and area establishments before disbanding in 1995 and regrouping in 1997.

Based in Toronto, the band's original line-up consisted of guitarist and lead vocalist Adam Gontier, drummer and backing vocalist Neil Sanderson, and bassist Brad Walst. In 2003, Barry Stock was recruited as the band's lead guitarist, making them a quartet. In 2013, Gontier left the band and was replaced by My Darkest Days' vocalist Matt Walst, the younger brother of Brad Walst.

Currently signed to RCA Records, they have released seven studio albums, six of which at three-year intervals: Three Days Grace in 2003, One-X in 2006, Life Starts Now in 2009, Transit of Venus in 2012, Human in 2015, and Outsider in 2018. Their seventh studio album Explosions was released on May 6, 2022. The first three albums have been RIAA certified 2× platinum, 3× platinum, and platinum, respectively, in the United States. In Canada, they have been certified by Music Canada as platinum, triple platinum, and double platinum, respectively. In the United Kingdom, their second album One-X was certified silver by the British Phonographic Industry. The band has 17 No. 1 songs on the Billboard Hot Mainstream Rock Tracks chart and 3 No. 1 hits on Alternative Songs.

History

As Groundswell (1992–1997) 

The band started out as a quintet named "Groundswell" in Norwood, Ontario, in 1992. Groundswell released one full-length album, Wave of Popular Feeling in 1995, containing singles "Eddie", "Poison Ivy" and "Stare". The band's line-up consisted of lead vocalist Adam Gontier, drummer Neil Sanderson, bassist Brad Walst, lead guitarist Phil Crowe, and rhythm guitarist Joe Grant. Most of the members were attending high school when the band formed. By the end of 1997, the band had broken up.

Early years as Three Days Grace (1997–2002) 

In 1997, Gontier, Sanderson, and Walst regrouped as "Three Days Grace". According to Gontier, the name refers to a sense of urgency, with the question being whether someone could change something in their life if they had only three days to make a change. Once in Toronto, the band became acquainted with local producer Gavin Brown. They gave him several years' worth of material which they had created, and he "...picked out what he called 'the golden nuggets'", according to Gontier. Brown and the band polished the songs and created a demo album, which they gave to EMI Music Publishing Canada. The record label wanted to hear more material, and with Brown producing, the band created the song, "I Hate Everything About You", which attracted the interest of several record labels. Three Days Grace were soon signed to Jive Records after being sought out by the company's then-president Barry Weiss.

Three Days Grace (2003–2005) 

They moved to Long View Farm, a studio in North Brookfield, Massachusetts, to record their debut album. The group completed half of the album at Long View, while the rest was done at Bearsville Studios in Bearsville, New York. The self-titled album was finished in Woodstock, New York and released on July 22, 2003.

To support the eponymous album, the band released their first single, "I Hate Everything About You" (the song whose demo had gotten the band a record deal) on April 28, 2003. The song received heavy airplay and rapidly became widely recognizable, and was labelled as the band's "breakout hit". The song peaked at No. 1 on the Canadian rock chart becoming their first number-one hit in the country. In support of their major label debut, the group joined Trapt as an opening act on a US tour from July to September 2003. In late 2003, Barry Stock joined the group after the band was auditioning for a second guitar player. Stock was introduced to the group by his manager in Toronto after they needed some help with their gear. The group joined Nickelback on The Long Road Tour between October to November 2003. The band also joined Evanescence on a North American Tour in 2004, as well as Hoobastank on the Let it Out Tour that same year. The group embarked on a headlining tour in 2004 called the Three Days Grace World Tour. The album peaked at No. 9 on the Canadian Albums Chart and No. 69 on the Billboard 200, and was certified platinum in the U.S. by the RIAA in December 2004 and double platinum in Canada by the CRIA. The album's second single "Just Like You" was released on March 29, 2004. The song became their first number-one hit on the US Billboard Alternative Airplay and Mainstream Rock charts. "Home" was released on October 4, 2004 as the third single from the album. The fourth and final single "Wake Up" was released exclusively in Canada on January 10, 2005.

Three Days Grace was met with mixed-to-favourable reviews. Dave Doray of IGN said of the album, "Almost every single song from the Three Days Grace track list is heavy and catchy, with chewy chunks of assurance and fury thrown in for added measure." AllMusic reviewer Heather Phares criticized the album for its simplicity, but praised the groups "tight songwriting" and "unexpectedly pretty choruses" that make them standout among their peers. However, Spin gave a negative review calling it, "generic Canadian gripe rock."

The band appeared as themselves in the 2004 film Raise Your Voice, performing the songs "Are You Ready" and "Home".

One-X (2006–2008) 

Around this time, Gontier developed an addiction to the prescription drug OxyContin. After finishing the tour for their first album, the band knew they could not continue with the condition he was in, so in 2005, with the support of his family, friends, and band members, Gontier checked himself into the Centre for Addiction and Mental Health (CAMH) in Toronto. While in treatment, Gontier began writing lyrics for songs regarding how he felt and what he was going through in rehabilitation.

Gontier successfully completed treatment at CAMH. The band found a place suitable for further songwriting in Northern Ontario, in a cottage where they experimented on, tested, and practiced new songs. After three months at the cottage, they had about finished what would be their second album. Gontier contributed lyrics about his experiences in rehab; the first single from One-X, titled "Animal I Have Become", features lyrics Gontier had written while getting sober. In a 2006 interview, Gontier said that the album's material was more personal to him than the band's previous work because the inspiration had come out of his experiences with despondence, drug abuse, and rehab, which had constituted the past two years of his life.

One-X was released on June 13, 2006, and was produced by Howard Benson. This also marked Stock's first effort with the band. In support of the album, Gontier launched the "Three Days to Change" tour doing free concerts at treatment centres, shelters, group homes and detention centres across North America. In November 2006, Gontier performed with the band at a special show at the CAMH in Toronto, where he had gone for his own rehab. Following the performance, Gontier did a 50-minute Q&A session which was filmed as part of the "Behind the Pain" documentary.

One-X was met with mostly positive reviews. The Toronto Star complimented the album with a review title of "One CD Worth Buying..." and focused on its lyrics, saying: "The lyrics really speak out to you, especially if you're going through a tough time in your life." Allmusic reviewer Corey Apar praised the music, saying it "remains catchy despite its lyrical darkness", but pointed out that Three Days Grace is "hardly innovative" in their approach to writing music and that "further distinctive qualities" would help the band separate itself "...from their alt-metal peers".

One-X peaked at No. 2 on the Canadian album chart and at No. 5 on the Billboard 200, selling 78,000 copies in the U.S. in its first week of release. "Animal I Have Become" was Three Days Grace's most successful single, becoming 2006's most played rock song in Canada. The album helped Three Days Grace become the No. 1 rock artist by airplay in the U.S. and Canada in 2007, with Billboard ranking them as the No. 1 rock artist of 2007. One-X was certified triple platinum in both Canada and the US. Three Days Grace toured the U.S. and Canada throughout the second half of 2006 and all of 2007 in support of One-X. In early 2008, they toured across the U.S. alongside Seether and Breaking Benjamin.

Life Starts Now (2009–2011) 

From March to August 2008, and from January to April 2009, the band recorded their third album at The Warehouse Studio in Vancouver, British Columbia, and in Los Angeles, again with producer Howard Benson who had worked with them on their previous releases. The album, entitled Life Starts Now, was released on September 22, 2009. Critics as well as band members have noted the album's departure from the angry tone of the band's previous releases into a lyrical style that is perceived as more optimistic. This album reflects the maturity of the band members as they overcome problems such as sickness and death within their families; in a published statement they were quoted as saying: "We had to be inspired by it, but the outcome is this: It's a new beginning. It's life starting over." According to guitarist Barry Stock, the album's theme centres around "a new sense of freshness" and the idea that "you don't have to be stuck in whatever it is you're dealing with. Whether it's good or bad, it's your choice to make a change".

Life Starts Now debuted at No. 3 on the Billboard 200, the band's highest chart position to date, and sold 79,000 copies in its first week. The album was met with mostly positive reviews. Ben Rayner of the Toronto Star gave the album a negative review, saying it possesses "no sound of its own, just a shallow range between Linkin Park and Nickelback". According to Allmusic reviewer James Christopher Monger, who gave the album three out of five stars, Life Starts Now "...continues the theme of One-X, Gontier's personal demons, but with a 'hint of sunlight'." He complimented the album, however, saying it "...treats the well-worn metal themes of anger, isolation, heartache, and redemption with the kind of begrudging respect they deserve, pumping out a competent flurry of fist-bump anthems and world-weary, mid-tempo rockers".

The first single release from the album, "Break", was released on September 1, 2009. In support of the record, the band embarked on the Life Starts Now Tour, with 20 Canadian shows lasting through November and December 2009 and U.S. shows in January–February 2010. They were joined by Breaking Benjamin and Flyleaf during the U.S. shows.

Life Starts Now was nominated for "Best Rock Album" at the 2010 Juno Awards, but lost to Billy Talent III. They went on tour with Nickelback and Buckcherry on the "Dark Horse Fall 2010 Tour" and they later toured with My Darkest Days starting in March 2011.

Transit of Venus and Gontier's departure (2012–2013) 

On October 7, 2011, the RCA Music Group announced it was disbanding Jive Records along with Arista and J Records, and moving all the artists signed to the three labels to its RCA Records brand, which included Three Days Grace.

On June 5, 2012, the same day as Venus' visible transit across the sun, the band announced that their fourth studio album would be called Transit of Venus and released on October 2, 2012. They created an early promotional video on their website featuring clips of them in the studio as well as footage of the physical transit of Venus. Due to the rarity of this occurrence, they created the slogan, "Some things will never happen again in your lifetime", reflecting both this uncommon occurrence as well as the mood that the lyrics and music would most likely take on. The first single from the album, "Chalk Outline", was released on August 14.

On January 9, 2013, the band announced that Gontier had left the band. They described Gontier's departure as being abrupt and unexplained. The departure came just weeks before a co-headlining tour with Shinedown. Gontier explained that he was simply ready to start a new chapter in his life, stating, "After twenty years of being part of an ever evolving band, I have been inspired by life, to move on and to continue to evolve on my own terms." Brad Walst's brother, Matt (of My Darkest Days), became the band's new lead singer. They commenced their 2013 tour in Moline, Illinois. Shinedown and P.O.D. accompanied the band throughout the tour. Dani Rosenoer, the band's touring keyboardist and backing vocalist since 2012, also joined the band for the tour.

Human (2014–2017) 

During an interview on July 19, 2013, with 99.9 KISW in Seattle, Neil Sanderson confirmed the band was currently working on a new album and they had already recorded half of it. He stated, "We're really amped-up about it, it's got a new energy. It's a little heavier, and it's just more aggressive and it's just got this fresh vibe." A new track entitled "Painkiller" was released to US Rock radio stations on April 8, 2014. On June 6, 2014, "Painkiller" reached No. 1 on the Mainstream Rock Charts, which made it the eleventh No. 1 single the band has released. In an August 2014 interview, the band revealed the title of their next single, "I Am Machine", which was released September 30, 2014, On January 26, 2015, it was revealed that the new album would be titled Human. On March 23, 2015, "Human Race" was released as the third single. Human was released on March 31. In early 2015, the band toured Europe, followed by touring predominantly throughout the United States and later in Canada, starting in November 2015. Halestorm supported most of the Canadian dates. The band toured Europe and Russia in early 2016. On November 18, 2016, Three Days Grace released a cover of the Phantogram song "You Don't Get Me High Anymore".

Outsider (2017–2020) 

The band began recording their sixth studio album, Outsider, in July 2017, releasing "The Mountain" as the first single on January 25, 2018, with an accompanying music video. The song peaked at No. 1 on the Billboard Mainstream Rock chart in March 2018 and became their 13th No. 1 on the chart while tying the record with Van Halen. The album was released on March 9, 2018. On June 12, "Infra-Red" was released as the band's second single from the album. "Infra-Red" peaked at No. 1 on the Billboard's Mainstream Rock Songs chart and it is their 14th No. 1 single. With this latest achievement, the band broke Van Halen's two-decade record of topping the chart. On November 13, 2018 "Right Left Wrong" was released as the band's third single from the album. It peaked at No. 1 on the Billboards Mainstream Rock Songs chart and it is their 15th No. 1 single. On March 14, 2019, the band won Rock Artist of the Year on 2019 iHeartRadio Music Awards.

On July 23, 2020, the band released a cover of Gotye's "Somebody That I Used to Know".

 Explosions (2021–present) 

On March 1, 2021, the band confirmed that they were in the studio recording for their seventh studio album on Instagram.

On November 29, 2021, the band released a new single called "So Called Life" as the first single from their seventh studio album, Explosions, which was released on May 6, 2022. The song reached the Billboard Mainstream Rock chart at number one, topping the chart for four consecutive weeks.

Three months later, on February 17, 2022, the band released a promotional single, titled "Neurotic", featuring Lukas Rossi. Along with the song releasing, the band released a lyric video of the new track. On April 11, 2022, the band released "Lifetime" as the album's second radio single. The song was dedicated to the people of Mayfield, Kentucky after an EF4 tornado hit the city in December 2021. It peaked at number one on the Billboard Mainstream Rock chart. This marks the band's 17th number-one song on the Mainstream Rock Airplay chart.

On September 27, 2022, the third single from the album "I Am the Weapon", was released for radio airplay shortly after the band began performing the song live during their European tour for the album.

 Awards and nominations 

The band have been recognized for their musical efforts through several awards and nominations. In 2007, the band was ranked by Mediabase as the top artist in airplay across all rock formats in the U.S. and Canada, and Billboard named them Rock Artist of the Year. They have been nominated for 12 Juno awards but only won one for "Producer of the Year" for "I Hate Everything About You" in 2004. The song was also nominated for "Best Rock Video" and "People's Choice: Favourite Canadian Group" at the 2004 MuchMusic Video Awards. In 2007, they were nominated for "Best Group of the Year", and their album One-X for "Album of the Year" at the Juno Awards. The band's first single from One-X, "Animal I Have Become", was Canada's most-played rock song in 2006 and won that year's Mediabase award for the most-played rock song on radio. The song also won "Rock Single of the Year" at the 2006 Billboard Music Awards. "Never Too Late" was nominated for "Best Video" and "Best Rock Video", and "Pain" was nominated for "Best International Video by a Canadian" and "People's Choice: Favorite Canadian Group" at the 2007 MuchMusic Video Awards.

In 2010, Life Starts Now was nominated for "Best Rock Album" at the Juno awards, but lost to Billy Talent III. In 2010, "Break" was nominated for "Best Post Production Video" and "Best Rock Video of the Year" at the 2010 MuchMusic Video Awards on Fuse.tv. "Break" was nominated for "Best Single" and Life Starts Now won for "Best Album" at the Casby Awards.

They were nominated for the 2016 Juno Award for Group of the Year.

Three Days Grace were nominated for three Juno Awards, Outsider for Album of the Year and Rock Album of the Year and the band for Group of the Year at the Juno Awards 2019.

On March 14, 2019, the band won Rock Artist of the Year on 2019 iHeartRadio Music Awards.

They won the Rock Songwriters of the Year award for "The Mountain" in the 30th anniversary of the SOCAN Awards.

They were nominated for an MTV Video Music Award for Best Rock Video 2022 for "So Called Life". They were nominated at the 2023 iHeartRadio Music Awards for Rock Artist of the Year and their song "So Called Life" for Rock Song of the Year. Explosions was nominated for Rock Album Of The Year at the 2023 Juno Awards.

 Musical style 

Their music has been described as post-grunge, hard rock, alternative metal, alternative rock, and nu metal. Their self-titled album mostly features the sounds of alternative metal and nu metal. However, on their second album, One-X, the band had more guitar solos and a more melodic sound. Their fourth album, Transit of Venus, included a few electronic influences.

 Legacy 
The band has a record 17 No. 1 songs on the Billboard Mainstream Rock chart. Billboard ranked the group at number three on their "Greatest of All Time Mainstream Rock Artists" list. Loudwire named "Animal I Have Become" the 45th "Top 21st Century Hard Rock Songs" in 2012 and also listed "Never Too Late" as one of the "66 Best Hard Rock Songs of the 21st Century" in 2020. "I Hate Everything About You" was ranked at number 9 on the Billboard Decade-End Alternative Songs chart in 2009. Billboard named "Break", "Chalk Outline", "Pain", "Animal I Have Become" and "I Am Machine" as the "Greatest Mainstream Rock Songs" on their "Greatest of All Time" list with "Break" and "Chalk Outline" in the top 10. Former lead singer of the band, Adam Gontier, has been considered to have a, "passionate vocal style, naturally husky sound, and lyricism chock full of the angst and torment" making him a unique singer that many teenagers and others living through hardships found relatable.

 Band members Current members Brad Walst – bass guitar, backing vocals (1997−present)
 Neil Sanderson – drums, backing vocals (1997−present); keyboards (2009–present)
 Barry Stock − lead guitar (2003−present); rhythm guitar (2013−2017)
 Matt Walst − lead vocals (2013−present); rhythm guitar (2017−present)Former members Adam Gontier – lead vocals, rhythm guitar (1997−2013); lead guitar (1997–2003)Touring musicians Dani Rosenoer – backing vocals, keyboards (2012–2018)Timeline Discography 
		Studio albums Three Days Grace (2003)
 One-X (2006)
 Life Starts Now (2009)
 Transit of Venus (2012)
 Human (2015)
 Outsider (2018)
 Explosions (2022)

 Filmography 

 Tours Headlining Three Days Grace World Tour (2004)
 One-X Tour (2008)
 Life Starts Now Tour (2010)
 Human Tour (2015)
 The Outsider Tour (2018)
 Explosions Tour (2022)Co-Headlining North American Fall Tour  (2007)
 Welcome to the Family Tour  (2011)
 US Tour  (2013)
 End of the World Tour  (2018)As a support act US Tour  (2003)
 The Long Road Tour  (2003)
 North American Tour  (2004)
 Let it Out Tour  (2004)
 All the Right Reasons Tour  (2007)
 The Dark Horse Tour  (2010)
 The Revolutions Live  (2023)Festivals'
 Jägermeister Music Tour (2006)

References

External links 

 

1992 establishments in Canada
1995 disestablishments in Canada
1997 establishments in Canada
1992 establishments in Ontario
1995 disestablishments in Ontario
1997 establishments in Ontario
Canadian alternative metal musical groups
Canadian alternative rock groups
Canadian hard rock musical groups
Canadian post-grunge groups
Canadian nu metal musical groups
Jive Records artists
RCA Records artists
Musical groups established in 1992
Musical groups disestablished in 1995
Musical groups reestablished in 1997
Musical groups from Ontario
Musical quintets
Musical quartets
Sibling musical groups